Lee Chi Kin (born 27 December 1967) is a Hong Kong football manager.

Managerial History

Yokohama FC Hong Kong and Pegasus
He won the Hong Kong Coach of the Year award in 2015 as manager of Yokohama FC Hong Kong.

He moved to Pegasus during the subsequent offseason where he was manager for 20 months before being terminated in April 2016.

Tai Po
Lee Chi Kin joined Tai Po in June 2016. He worked quickly to bring on board players whom he had worked with during previous coaching stints including Yuen Chun Sing, Wong Wai, Lee Ka Yiu, Tan Chun Lok, and Fung Hing Wa.

During his first season, he led Tai Po to 6th place in the Premier League, their best finish at that point in club history. The following season, he led the club to a runners-up finishing, better the result from the previous season.

In 2018–19, Lee led Tai Po to their first Hong Kong Premier League title in club history, becoming the first district club to win a top flight title since 1963. For this achievement, he was named the 2019 Hong Kong Coach of the Year.

At the end of the season, Lee announced that he would mutually part ways with Tai Po as the club faced budget clubs due to reduced sponsorship.

Eastern

On 3 July 2019, Lee left Tai Po to join Eastern.

In his first season, the club won the 2019–20 Senior Shield and the 2019–20 Hong Kong FA Cup.

Honours

Manager
Eastern
 Hong Kong Senior Shield: 2019–20
 Hong Kong FA Cup: 2019–20
 Hong Kong Sapling Cup: 2020–21

 Tai Po
 Hong Kong Premier League: 2018–19
 Hong Kong Sapling Cup: 2016–17

Individual
 Hong Kong Coach of the Year: 2015, 2019

References

Living people
Hong Kong football managers
Yokohama FC Hong Kong managers
TSW Pegasus FC managers
Tai Po FC managers
Eastern Sports Club football managers
1967 births